Girls of Today (German: Mädels von heute) is a 1933 German comedy film directed by Herbert Selpin and starring Viktor de Kowa, Annie Markart  and Oscar Sabo.  The film's sets were designed by the art director Willi Herrmann.

Cast
 Viktor de Kowa as Peter Udde
 Lily Rodien as Synnöve Heidecker
 Leni Sponholz as 	Inge Overhoff
 Annie Markart as Greta Priano 
 Oscar Sabo as 	Jurmann
 Aribert Mog as 	Kaunitz
 Henry Lorenzen as Olaf Hendersen
 F.W. Schröder-Schrom as Stefan Heidecker
 Lilo Hartmann as Lotte
 Günther Vogdt as Nunne
 Rudolf Klicks as 	Krümel
 Paul Henckels		
 Oscar Joost as Musikkapelle
 Gustav Püttjer
 Dolly Raphael
 Heinrich Schroth

References

Bibliography
 Rentschler, Eric. The Ministry of Illusion: Nazi Cinema and Its Afterlife. Harvard University Press, 1996.
 Klaus, Ulrich J. Deutsche Tonfilme: Jahrgang 1933. Klaus-Archiv, 1988.

External links 
 

1933 films
Films of Nazi Germany
German comedy films
1933 comedy films
1930s German-language films
German black-and-white films
1930s German films
Films directed by Herbert Selpin
Films based on German novels